Norman Wilkinson may refer to:

 Norman Wilkinson (artist) (1878–1971), British marine artist and camoufleur
 Norman Wilkinson (stage designer) (1882–1934), British stage designer
 Norman Wilkinson (footballer, born 1910) (1910–1975), English footballer
 Norman Wilkinson (footballer, born 1931) (1931–2011), English footballer